"Rise and Shine" is a charity single which the artist Poe dedicated to a young child named Levar who was HIV positive. A related benefit concert was held at the Lilac Festival in Rochester, New York, in May 1997 with Levar singing with Poe. It featured backing vocals by the singer Gwen Stefani.

Track listing
 "Intro" 1:00
 "Rise and Shine" 4:47
 "Levar's Lullaby" 2:49

References

Poe (singer) songs
Charity singles
Children's songs
1998 singles
Atlantic Records singles
1998 songs